The singles discography of American country music artist Lynn Anderson contains 72 singles, three promotional singles, one charting B-side, two music videos and nine other song appearances. She signed her first recording contract with Chart Records in 1966. The following year, her single "Ride, Ride, Ride" debuted on the Billboard Hot Country Singles chart. Also in 1967, her single "If I Kiss You (Will You Go Away)" became her first major hit when it reached number five on the country singles chart. Anderson had a series of hits that reached the top ten and 20 during the 1960s including "Promises, Promises" (1969), "No Another Time" (1968), "Big Girls Don't Cry" (1968) and "That's a No No" (1969).

Anderson had her biggest song success after switching to Columbia Records in 1970. Her second Columbia single, "Rose Garden", became the biggest hit of her career. The song reached number one on the Billboard country chart and was her first to crossover onto the Billboard Hot 100, where it reached number three. "Rose Garden" would also become a hit in 16 other countries. Anderson followed the song with two more number one hits on the Billboard country chart: "You're My Man" and "How Can I Unlove You". 

Her cover version of "Cry" became a top five country hit and minor pop hit in 1972. This was followed by "Keep Me in Mind" (1973) and "What a Man My Man Is" (1974), which both topped the Billboard country survey. Anderson was also the first artist to release and have a hit with "Top of the World", a song that was later a number one pop hit for The Carpenters. As the decade progressed, Anderson's singles were less successful. She had top 20 Billboard country hits during this time with "He Turns It into Love Again" (1977) and "Wrap Your Love All Around Your Man" (1977). In 1979, she had a top ten hit with "Isn't It Always Love" before leaving Columbia Records in 1981.

Anderson returned in 1983 after a short hiatus with "What I Learned from Loving You". The song reached number 18 on the Billboard country songs chart. It was followed in 1984 by "You're Welcome to Tonight", a duet with Gary Morris that reached number nine on the country survey. Her 1988 cover of "Under the Boardwalk" reached number 24 on the country singles chart in 1988. In 1989, "How Many Hearts" became her final single to make the Billboard Hot Country Songs chart, peaking at number 69. Although she continued recording, Anderson released fewer singles towards the end of her career. Her final singles were released in 2015.

Singles

As lead artist

Other singles

Promotional singles

Other charted songs

Other song appearances

Music videos

Notes

References

External links
 Lynn Anderson singles discography at Discogs

Country music discographies
Discographies of American artists